The 2015–16 V Football Group season was the 66th season of the Bulgarian V Group. The group comprised the third level of the Bulgarian football pyramid and was divided into four geographic regions: North-West, North-East, South-East, and South-West. The 2015-16 season was notable for the participation of CSKA Sofia and Lokomotiv Sofia in the South-Western region, as the two teams were unable to obtain a license for the A PFG due to unpaid debts, which led to their administrative relegation.

Changes from the 2014–15 season

Club Movements Between V Group and B Group
The champions of the four 2014–15 V AFG divisions were promoted to the 2015–16 B Group: Dunav Ruse from V AFG North-East and Pomorie from V AFG South-East, Spartak Pleven from V AFG North-West and Oborishte Panagyurishte from V AFG South-West.

In return, four teams were relegated to the V AFG: Botev Vratsa, Chernomorets Burgas, Rakovski and Spartak Varna.

Club Movements Between V Group and the Regional Groups
 North-East: Provadia and Dorostol 2003 relegated last season to regional divisions. Spartak Varna, which relegated to the amateur divisions on financial and organizational reasons, declared on 11 August 2015 its inability to participate shortly before the start of the season. The new teams, coming from the regional divisions, are Inter Plachidol, Marisan Ruse and Himik Devnya.
 North-West: Vidima-Rakovski Sevlievo and Sitomir Nikopol relegated from last season to regional divisions. The new teams, coming from the regional divisions, are Era Sevlievo, Gigant Belene, Vihar Slavnyanovo and Tryavna. The team of Era Sevlievo renamed itself into FC Sevlievo.
 South-East: FC Stara Zagora relegated from last season to regional divisions, while Elhovo and Rodopa Smolyan resigned shortly before the start of the season. Furthermore, Tundzha Yambol declared on 31 July 2015 their inability to participate this season due to financial and organizational reasons. Its place was taken by FC Karnobat, which won 3-0 a play-off game against Vereya Stara Zagora II in Elhovo. The new teams, coming from the regional divisions, are Uragan Boyadzhik and Borislav Parvomay.
 South-West: FC Sportist Svoge and Mesta Hadzhidimovo relegated from last season to regional divisions. The new teams, coming from the regional divisions, are Chiko Byaga, Botev Ihtiman and Sofia 2010. New teams, coming from A PFG, are CSKA Sofia and Lokomotiv Sofia as they had not received professional license. Two days before the start of the season, the game between CSKA and Slivnishki Geroy was postponed due to problems with the CSKA players' files, which is currently resolved. After playing its first game, the other Sofia powerhouse Lokomotiv declared its inability to maintain its participation due to financial and organizational reasons. The decision was confirmed by the Zonal Council of BFU on 24 August 2015, which led to the expulsion of Lokomotiv and the annulment of its current results. Conegliano German, which finished 10th last season, was acquired by DIT Group and later merged into PFC Septemvri Sofia.

Broadcasting

Kanal 3 is the TV partner of the V group.

North-East V AFG

South-East V AFG

North-West V AFG

South-West V AFG

References

Third Amateur Football League (Bulgaria) seasons
3
Bulgaria